Gerardo González  (born 17 September 1932) is a Colombian former sports shooter. He competed in the skeet event at the 1972 Summer Olympics.

References

1932 births
Living people
Colombian male sport shooters
Olympic shooters of Colombia
Shooters at the 1972 Summer Olympics
Place of birth missing (living people)
20th-century Colombian people